Cowboy Songs is the sixteenth album by American singer-songwriter Michael Martin Murphey and his first album of cowboy songs. The album peaked at number 25 on the Billboard Top Country Albums chart.

Track listings
 "Cowboy Logic" (Don Cook, Chick Rains) – 3:35
 "I Ride an Old Paint" / "Whoopee Ti-Yi-Yo, Git Along Little Doggies" (Traditional) – 3:01
 "Tumbling Tumbleweeds" (Nolan) – 2:20
 "Tying Knots in the Devil's Tail" – 3:06
 "The Old Chisholm Trail" – 4:46
 "Home on the Range" – 3:31
 "What Am I Doing Here" (Michael Martin Murphey, Cook, Raines) – 3:02
 "Wild Ripplin' Waters" – 1:47
 "The Yellow Rose of Texas" (Traditional) – 3:00
 "Spanish is the Loving Tongue" (Clark, Simon) – 5:40
 "Cowboy Pride" (Tyson) – 2:51
 "Red River Valley" – 3:30
 "Let the Cowboy Dance" (Murphey, Cook, Raines) – 3:01
 "Jack of Diamonds" – 1:13
 "Texas Rangers" – 3:21
 "When the Work's All Done This Fall" (Traditional) – 3:18
 "The Streets of Laredo" (Murphey, PD) – 4:06
 "O Bury Me Not on the Lone Prairie" – 3:02
 "Where Do Cowboys Go When They Die" / "Reincarnation" – 3:42
 "Goodbye Old Paint" – 2:13
 "Happy Trails" (Evans) – 2:16

Credits
Music
 Michael Martin Murphey – vocals, guitar, producer, arranger
 Tammy Wynette – background vocals
 Steve Gibson – electric guitar, mandolin, background vocals, producer
 Biff Watson – guitar
 Mark Casstevens – guitar, harmonica
 Paul Franklin – steel guitar
 Sonny Garrish – steel guitar
 John McEuen – banjo, mandolin, fiddle
 Dennis Burnside – keyboards
 David Hoffner – keyboards, hammer dulcimer
 Mark O'Connor – fiddle
 Terry McMillan – harmonica
 Michael Rhodes – bass
 Craig Nelson – electric bass
 Eddie Bayers – drums
 Jerry Kroon – drums
 Don Edwards – background vocals
 Jack Hannah – background vocals
 Curtis Stone – background vocals
 Cactus Moser – background vocals
 Jack Daniels – background vocals
 Suzy Bogguss – background vocals
 Paulette Carlson – background vocals
 Red Steagall – background vocals
 Lon Hannah – background vocals
 Dennis Wilson – background vocals
 Curtis Young – background vocals

Production
 Steve Gibson – producer
 Rich Schirmer – recording, mixing,
 Carry Summers – assistant
 Steve Bishir – assistant
 Denny Purcell – mastering
 William Matthews – art direction, watercolor painting
 Steve Whatley – design

Charts

Weekly charts

Year-end charts

Certifications

References

External links
 Michael Martin Murphey's Official Website

1990 albums
Michael Martin Murphey albums
Warner Records albums